Taher Elgamal (Arabic: طاهر الجمل) (born 18 August 1955) is an Egyptian cryptographer and entrepreneur. He has served as the Chief Technology Officer (CTO) of Security at Salesforce since 2013. Prior to that, he was the founder and CEO of Securify and the director of engineering at RSA Security. From 1995 to 1998, he was the chief scientist at Netscape Communications. He has been described as the "father of SSL" for the work he did in computer security while working at Netscape, which helped in establishing a private and secure communications on the Internet.

Elgamal's 1985 paper entitled "A Public Key Cryptosystem and A Signature Scheme Based on Discrete Logarithms" proposed the design of the ElGamal discrete log cryptosystem and of the ElGamal signature scheme. The latter scheme became the basis for Digital Signature Algorithm (DSA) adopted by National Institute of Standards and Technology (NIST) as the Digital Signature Standard (DSS).

Biography

Early life 
According to an article on Medium, Elgamal's first love was mathematics. Although he came to the United States to pursue a PhD in Electrical Engineering at Stanford University, he said that "cryptography was the most beautiful use of math he'd ever seen".

Elgamal earned a BSc from Cairo University in 1977, and MS and PhD degrees in Electrical Engineering from Stanford University in 1981 and 1984, respectively. Martin Hellman was his dissertation advisor.

Career 
Elgamal joined the technical staff at HP Labs in 1984.  He served as chief scientist at Netscape Communications from 1995 to 1998, where he was a driving force behind Secure Sockets Layer. He also was the director of engineering at RSA Security Inc. before founding Securify in 1998 and becoming its chief executive officer. According to an interview with Elgamal, when Securify was acquired by Kroll-O'Gara, he became the president of its information security group. After helping Securify spin out from Kroll-O'Gara, Taher served as the company's chief technology officer (CTO) from 2001 to 2004. In late 2008, Securify was acquired by Secure Computing and is now part of McAfee. In October 2006, he joined Tumbleweed Communications as a CTO. Tumbleweed was acquired in 2008 by Axway Inc. Elgamal is now a CTO for security at Salesforce.com.

Entrepreneurial ventures 
Elgamal is a co-founder of NokNok Labs and InfoSec Global. He serves as a director of Vindicia, Inc., which provides online payment services, Zix Corporation, which provides email encryption services, and Bay Dynamics. He has served as an adviser to Cyphort, Bitglass, Onset Ventures, Glenbrook Partners, PGP corporation, Arcot Systems, Finjan, Actiance, Symplified, and Zetta. He served as Chief Security Officer of Axway, Inc. He is vice chairman of SecureMisr.

Executive roles 
Elgamal has also held executive roles at technology and security companies, including

 CTO of Security at Salesforce.com from 2013 to present,
 CSO at Axway, Inc. from 2008 to 2011,
 CTO at Tumbleweed Communications from 2006 to 2008,
 CTO at Securify, Inc. from 2001 to 2004,
 CEO and President of Securify, Inc. from 1998 to 2001 and,
 Chief Scientist of Netscape Communications from 1995 to 1998.

Recognition 

 Elgamal is a recipient of the RSA Conference 2009 Lifetime Achievement Award, and he is recognized as the "father of SSL," the Internet security standard Secure Sockets Layer. 
 Elgamal and Paul Kocher were jointly awarded the 2019 Marconi Prize for "their development of SSL/TLS and other contributions to the security of communications".
 Election to the National Academy of Engineering, 2022, for contributions to cryptography, e-commerce, and protocols for secure internet transactions.

Publications 
As a scholar, Elgamal published 4 articles:

 T. ElGamal, "A subexponential-time algorithm for computing discrete logarithms over GF(p2)", IEEE Trans. Inf. Theory, vol. 31, no. 4, pp. 473–481, 1985.
 T. Elgamal, "A public key cryptosystem and a signature scheme based on discrete logarithms", IEEE Trans. Inf. Theory, vol. 31, no. 4, pp. 469–472, Jul. 1985.
 T. ElGamal, "On Computing Logarithms Over Finite Fields", in Advances in Cryptology — CRYPTO ’85 Proceedings, 1986, pp. 396–402.
 T. Elgamal, "The new predicaments of security practitioners", Computer Fraud & Security, vol. 2009, no. 11, pp. 12–14, Nov. 2009.

Notes

References

External links 

 Serial Entrepreneur Interview with Sramana Mitra

1955 births
American people of Egyptian descent
Egyptian electrical engineers
Modern cryptographers
Public-key cryptographers
Egyptian cryptographers
American cryptographers
Cairo University alumni
Living people
Chief technology officers